Carraro Agritalia is an Italian agricultural machinery manufacturer that designs and builds standard, vineyard and orchard specialty tractors. Is a division of the Carraro Group, which is separate from Antonio Carraro. Carraro Group was founded in Campodarsego, Italy in 1910 as Giovanni Carraro. The division Carraro Agritalia was founded in Rovigo, Italy in 1977.

History 
Carraro Group was founded by Giovanni Carraro and first manufactured agricultural equipment, seeders, in 1932. The first tractor was built in 1958. Antonio Carraro separated from his brothers in 1960 to form the Antonio Carraro company. In 1977 Carraro Group decided to transfer the production of tractors to Rovigo.

Products & Services 
Carraro Agritalia designs and builds standard, vineyard and orchard specialty tractors from 55-100 hp under contract for various tractor manufacturers and distributors. Current and past clients include: Antonio Carraro, Case IH, Challenger, Claas, Eicher, John Deere, Massey Ferguson, Renault, Valtra & Yagmur.

In 2010 Carraro Agritalia re-launched an own range of tractors sold under the logo Carraro, Tractors Built for the Best. 

Carraro Agritalia also offers engineering services for the design of tractors to third parties.

See also
List of tractors built by other companies

References

External links

Carraro Group webpage
Carraro Agritalia webpage
Carraro Yedek Parça webpage

Agricultural machinery manufacturers of Italy
Tractor manufacturers of Italy
Italian brands
Italian companies established in 1977